Mark Clay Brandenburg (born July 14, 1970) is an American former middle-relief pitcher in Major League Baseball who played from  through  for the Texas Rangers (1995–96) and Boston Red Sox (1996–97). Brandenburg batted and threw right-handed. Listed at 6' 0", 180 lb., he was selected by the Texas Rangers in the 1992 draft out of Texas Tech.

In a three-season career, Brandenburg posted a 5–8 record with a 4.49 earned run average, 121 strikeouts, 56 walks, 144 ⅓ innings, and no saves, in 97 games pitched.

In July 2008, Brandenburg was inducted into the Texas Tech Athletics Hall of Fame.

His daughter, Ryan Kate, appeared on Season 3 of MasterChef Junior.

Notes

External links

1970 births
Living people
Major League Baseball pitchers
Texas Rangers players
Boston Red Sox players
Oklahoma RedHawks players
Pawtucket Red Sox players
Texas Tech Red Raiders baseball players
Baseball players from Houston
Panola Ponies baseball players
Butte Copper Kings players
Charleston Rainbows players
Oklahoma City 89ers players
Charlotte Rangers players
Sarasota Red Sox players
Tulsa Drillers players